Remake is a 2003 Bosnian war film directed by Dino Mustafić, and produced by Enes Cviko and Martine de Clermont-Tonnerre. The film is a Turkish-French co-production.

The film stars Ermin Bravo, Aleksandar Seksan, Ermin Sijamija, Dejan Aćimović, Lucija Šerbedžija, Emir Hadžihafizbegović, Miraj Grbić, François Berléand, Évelyne Bouix, and was written by Zlatko Topčić (based on incidents which occurred in his life).

Remake tells the parallel coming-of-age stories of a father living in Sarajevo during World War II and his son living through the Siege of Sarajevo during the Bosnian War.

The film premiered at the 32nd International Film Festival Rotterdam on January 23, 2003. The film's US premiere was at the 2004 Wine Country Film Festival (San Francisco), where it won three awards: Best First Feature, Best Actor (Bravo) and Award for Peace and Cultural Understanding. It won a Special Mention Award at the 53rd Berlin International Film Festival.

Plot and theme
In the early 1990s, Tarik is a young Sarajevan just starting out as a writer. Before the onset of war in the former Yugoslavia, he sends a screenplay to a literary competition in France.

In a parallel plot, we see the dramatization of his script: a true story of his father Ahmed Karaga, who is unprepared for the outbreak of World War II and ends up in a concentration camp, but manages to survive. In the present plot, Ahmed's drama is almost identically replayed in the fate of Tarik. Only the era and the conditions of suffering have changed.

In Sarajevo, Tarik is captured by the Serbian Army and is subjected to the cruel conditions of a labour camp, which differs little from a concentration camp. After an unsuccessful attempt to escape, a famous French film producer helps exchange Tarik for another prisoner and ensures transportation to Paris.

There, where few know of the great tragedy that has struck Bosnia, he meets one of his tormentors.

The film explores the theme of revenge versus forgiveness, as well as the idea that history repeats itself and that those who do not learn from it are doomed to repeat it.

Remake is also a coming-of-age drama, with scenes in which Ahmed and Tarik go out with their friends, have fun, fall in love.

Cast and characters

Ermin Bravo as Tarik Karaga
Aleksandar Seksan as Miro Jovanović, Tarik's best friend
Miralem Zupčević as Ahmed Karaga, Tarik's father
Ermin Sijamija as the younger version of Ahmed
Dejan Aćimović as Duke Mišo, one of the commanders of the local Serbian forces and Tarik's neighbor
Lucija Šerbedžija as Eva Bebek, Ahmed's girlfriend from his youth
Slaven Knezović as Marko Kalaba, Ahmed's friend
Helena Minić as Alma Dizdarević, Tarik's girlfriend
Jasna Diklić as Desa Jovanović, Miro's mother
Zijah Sokolović as Mirsad Alihodžić "Hodža", a Bosnian refugee in France, war profiteer
François Berléand as Francois-Charles Leconte, producer
Évelyne Bouix as Katrin Leconte, producer's wife
Haris Begović as Adis Dizdarević, Alma's younger brother
Izudin Bajrović as Jovo, Serbian soldier
Emir Hadžihafizbegović as Željko, Serbian guard
Admir Glamočak as an interrogator, investigator, Ustasha
Mario Drmać as Remzo, a singer from the camp
Miraj Grbić as Mitar, Serbian guard
Mirsad Tuka as Vaso, Serbian soldier
Mirza Tanović as French UN officer
Rade Čolović as Zoka, Serbian guard
Jasmin Mekić as Miki, Serbian soldier
Mirvad Kurić as Salko, captive
Tahir Nikšić as Vlado, captive
Nakib Abdagić as Zijo Bajrić, captive
Edhem Husić as Meho Mizić, captive
Božo Bunjevac as Avdo Ligata, captive
Vlado Kerošević as major
Alen Muratović as Džemo, illegal
Tatjana Šojić as announcer
Vlado Jokanović as clergyman
Bojan Trišić as gutterman
Aldin Zulić as Don Dragiša de la Kuvelja
Boris Balta as Ustasha

Production

Remake is the first feature film directed by Dino Mustafić and the first written by Zlatko Topčić. Mustafić said in an interview: "We need a cathartic films that talk about our recent past. They are just as important as a testimony to the evil and stupidity of war does not happen again." Topčić said: "The script is devoid of ideological and daily political tinge. This movie wants to be a movie of love, not hate."

The film's script was published in 2002.

Filming
Filming took place in Paris, Sarajevo and other locations. Principal photography began in 2001.

Release

The film was released worldwide on January 23, 2003, by Forum and Terra Entertainment Inc. (US). It was released to cinemas throughout Bosnia and Herzegovina on February 22, 2003.

Music

Musician Adi Lukovac and singer Emina Zečaj collaborated on the soundtrack for the film.

Accolades

Reception

Box office
Remake was a box office hit. It is the most watched film in its native country ever.

Critical response
Ronald Holloway of Kino-German Film & International Reports wrote that "Remake should not be missed". Also, he called it "a major film event of 2003". Deborah Young, in Variety, remarked that the film "is long on narrative but short on original insight into Balkan history".

The film's world premiere was at the 32nd International Film Festival Rotterdam, where a critic said that Remake is a "very brave film, describing the situation as it was" and emphasized that "the restrained acting, the flowing transitions between the flashbacks and the clever cutting make Remake into a penetrating film experience". It was the most watched film of the festival and received a 20 minute standing ovation.

Some critics specifically praised the cult scene in which actor Mario Drmać sings a traditional folk song "". On Filmski.net, the film has a score of 5 out of 5 stars. MukMag rated Remake as one of the best films of ex-Socialist Federal Republic of Yugoslavia cinema.

International festival circuit
The film was screened at over 100 international film festivals around the world, including the Festival du Film de Paris, New York Film Festival, Los Angeles Film Festival, Tribeca Film Festival, Locarno Festival, Warsaw International Film Festival, International Film Festival Rotterdam, Berlin International Film Festival, Rome Film Festival, BFI London Film Festival, Gothenburg Film Festival, FEST, Salerno International Film Festival, Sydney Film Festival, Tokyo International Film Festival, Valencia International Film Festival Cinema Jove, Toronto International Film Festival, Sofia International Film Festival, Transilvania International Film Festival, São Paulo International Film Festival, Houston Cinema Arts Festival, Monaco International Film Festival, International Istanbul Film Festival, Montreal World Film Festival, Filmfest München, Prague International Film Festival - Febiofest, Karlovy Vary International Film Festival, Wine Country Film Festival, Cleveland International Film Festival, Sarajevo Film Festival, and many others.

It was screened at festivals in the Netherlands, Poland, Croatia, Serbia, France, Italy, United Kingdom, Sweden, Canada, Bulgaria, Romania, Brazil, Australia, Japan, Turkey, Spain, Monaco, Germany, the Czech Republic and the United States. It was also premiered on TV in the United States and Hungary.

See also
List of Bosnia and Herzegovina films
List of cult films
List of films set in Paris

References

External links

FILMSKI.NET about Remake

2003 films
Bosnia and Herzegovina war drama films
French war drama films
Films directed by Dino Mustafić
Bosnian War films
Yugoslav Wars films
World War II films
2000s war drama films
Films about anti-fascism
2000s French-language films
Bosnian-language films
Films set in Bosnia and Herzegovina
Films set in Sarajevo
Films set in France
Films set in Paris
Films with screenplays by Zlatko Topčić
2000s political drama films
2003 drama films
2000s English-language films
2000s French films